Scinax hayii is a species of frog in the family Hylidae.
It is endemic to Brazil.
Its natural habitats are subtropical or tropical moist lowland forests, subtropical or tropical moist montane forests, rivers, freshwater marshes, intermittent freshwater marshes, pastureland, urban areas, heavily degraded former forest, and ponds.

References

hayii
Endemic fauna of Brazil
Amphibians described in 1909
Taxonomy articles created by Polbot